Michael from the kindred Nánabeszter (died between 1268 and 1270) was a Hungarian nobleman in the 13th century, who served as ispán of Veszprém County from 1243 to 1244. He was also known as Michael Berki after his main residence.

Family
Michael was born into the gens (clan) Nánabeszter, which possessed landholdings along the river Danube in Central Hungary, in the surrounding area of royal capitals Esztergom and Buda. His father was Csom (or Chom), who was mentioned as a living person by a single document in 1228. Michael had a brother Stephen, with whom he was often involved in estate affairs. Michael had two sons: Thomas inherited his wealth but died without descendants, ending the line of Nánabeszters, while Lawrence entered ecclesiastical career and served as Provost of Požega from around 1288 until his death.

Career
When Michael first appeared in contemporary records in 1243, during the reign of Béla IV of Hungary, he already functioned as ispán of Veszprém County. He held the position at least until the next year, 1244. He was also patron of the abbey of Kapornak in Zala County in 1243. Michael bought a portion of Érd with half of the island and six servants belonging to it from John, son of Thaddeus Érdi before the collegiate chapter of Buda in 1243. His new lands laid in the neighborhood of the possessions of the provostry of Ócsa and the land of the royal armor-bearers to the north, which separated the other estates of the clan (Berki, Sóskút, Sasad and later Tárnok). Benedict, the provost of Székesfehérvár confirmed the contract of sale in 1244, when Michael Nánabeszter, John Érdi and Benedict, the provost of Ócsa determined the joint borders of their landholdings in Érd.

Michael, along with his brother Stephen, was a resident of the village of Berki in Pest County, which laid in the territory of present-day Érd, therefore Michael and his descendants were also referred to as with the surname Berki ("of Berki") in contemporary documents. Their relative, Nana III sold one of his servants, who lived in his estate Sasad (today a borough of Újbuda, Budapest), to Michael and Stephen in 1256.

The brothers endeavored to form their estates into single coherent areas in Central Hungary, southwest of the capital Buda. Throughout the 1260s, they were involved in a series of lawsuits with the queen's servants over a land Deszka near Tárnok Valley. Queen Maria Laskarina entrusted two arbiters, Csák from the clan Csák and her vice-chancellor Lawrence Becsegergely to judge over the long-drawn litigation in November 1268. This is the last information about Michael as a living person. He died shortly thereafter, sometime before 1270, when his brother Stephen and his son Thomas were present together in another lawsuit.

References

Sources

 
 
 
 
 

Michael
13th-century Hungarian people